Peter Conning (born 18 October 1964) is an English former professional footballer who played as a central midfielder.

Conning began his career with Liverpool's youth teams before moving to university where he joined Altrincham at the end of the 1983/84 season.

Conning played one season in the Football League with Rochdale in 1986/87 before returning to non league football where he played with Weymouth, Yeovil Town, Bashley, Dorchester Town, Trowbridge Town, Salisbury City, Bridport and Tiverton Town (where the club ended the 1998/99 season by getting to Wembley in the FA Vase beating Tow Law Town 1-0).

In 2002 Peter became a licensed players' agent, a business he still conducts today.

References

1964 births
Living people
Association football midfielders
English footballers
Rochdale A.F.C. players
English Football League players
Altrincham F.C. players
Weymouth F.C. players
Yeovil Town F.C. players
Bashley F.C. players
Dorchester Town F.C. players
Trowbridge Town F.C. players
Salisbury City F.C. players
Bridport F.C. players
Tiverton Town F.C. players